HMS Devonshire was an 80-gun third rate ship of the line of the Royal Navy, launched at Bursledon on 5 April 1692.

She was rebuilt at Woolwich Dockyard in 1704, but was destroyed in action in 1707 during the Battle at The Lizard on 21 October.

Notes

References

Lavery, Brian (2003) The Ship of the Line - Volume 1: The development of the battlefleet 1650-1850. Conway Maritime Press. .

Ships of the line of the Royal Navy
1690s ships
Ships built on the River Hamble